Armand-François Jouslin de La Salle, (15 September 1794 - 1 July 1863) was a French lawyer, journalist, dramatist and theatre director. Jouslin de La Salle was administrator of the Comédie-Française from 1832 to 1837, and then of the théâtre des Variétés in 1839.

Theatre 
 Le Mûrier, vaudeville in 1 act, with Jules Vernet 22 June 1819.
 Les Deux Veuves ou les Contrastes, comedy in 1 act, with Martial Aubertin, 10 April 1821.
 Jane Shore, melodrame en 3 acts, with Hyacinthe Decomberousse, Alphonse de Chavanges, 1824.
 La Famille du charlatan, folie vaudeville in 1 act, with Maurice de Chavanges, 12 October 1824.
 L’École du scandale, play in 3 acts and in prose, with Charles-R.-E. de Saint-Maurice, Edmond Crosnier, 8 December 1824.
 Les Acteurs à l’auberge, comedy in one act, with Maurice Alhoy and Francis Cornu, 28 May 1825.
 La Corbeille de mariage ou les Étrennes du futur, vaudeville in one act, with Maurice Alhoy and Léopold Chandezon, 31 December 1825.
 Monsieur de Pourceaugnac, ballet-folie-pantomime in 2 acts, with Jean Coralli, 28 janvier 1826.
 Le Tambour et la musette, tableau-vaudeville in one act, with Maurice Alhoy and Charles Nodier, 15 April 1826.
 Gulliver, ballet-folie en 2 actes, with Jean Coralli, 9 May 1826.
 Monsieur de Pourceaugnac, ballet-folie-pantomime in 2 acts, with Jean Coralli, théâtre de la Porte-Saint-Martin, 28 January 1826.
 Gulliver, ballet-folie in 2 acts, with Jean Coralli, théâtre de la Porte-Saint-Martin, 9 May 1826.
 Les Filets de Vulcain ou le Lendemain d’un succès, folie vaudeville in i act, with Dupin, théâtre de la Porte-Saint-Martin, 15 July 1826.
 Le Contumace, melodrama in 3 acts, with Charles-R.-E. de Saint-Maurice and Edmond Crosnier, 28 November 1826.
 Le Caissier, drama in 3 acts, with Charles-R.-E. de Saint-Maurice, 30 March 1828.

19th-century French dramatists and playwrights
19th-century French journalists
French male journalists
Administrators of the Comédie-Française
People from Vierzon
1794 births
1863 deaths
19th-century French male writers